The Society of Incorporated Accountants, founded in 1885 as the Society of Accountants, was a professional association of accountants in England. It was known from 1908 to 1954 as the Society of Incorporated Accountants and Auditors, and from 1954 to 1957 as the Society of Incorporated Accountants.

History
The Society of Accountants was established in 1885, initially in reaction to the restrictive practices of the Institute of Chartered Accountants in England and Wales (ICAEW), founded in 1880. Members were known as 'Incorporated Accountants'. Initially, members were mainly elected by the Society's Council, but in 1889 examinations were introduced and the Society established itself as an examining body.

In 1889 the Society began publishing a quarterly journal Incorporated Accountants' Journal, which became a monthly in 1895 and was renamed Accountancy in 1938. The Society was housed at Two Temple Place from 1928 to 1959. In 1957 it merged with the ICAEW.

Presidents
 Charles Henry Wilson (1902), of Leeds
 Charles Hewetson Nelson (1913-1916)
 Thomas Keens (1926–29)
 Bertram Nelson (1954-1956)

Arms

References

Further reading
 A. A. Garrett, History of the Society of Incorporated Accountants, 1885-1957, Oxford: Oxford University Press, 1961

External links

Organizations established in 1885
Organizations disestablished in 1957
Accounting in the United Kingdom
Incorporated Accountants
Professional accounting bodies